Now, There Was a Song! is the fifth studio album by American singer Johnny Cash. It features songs by notable country singers Ernest Tubb, Hank Williams, and George Jones. It was released on May 2, 1960 on the Columbia record label.

Track listing

Personnel
 Johnny Cash - vocals, rhythm guitar
Tennessee Two
 Luther Perkins - lead guitar
 Marshall Grant - bass
with:
 Johnny Western - rhythm guitar
 Don Helms - steel guitar
 Buddy Harman - drums
 Gordon Terry - fiddle
 Floyd Cramer - piano

Charts
Singles - Billboard (United States)

References

External links
 Maninblack.net Great Johnny Cash Fansite
 LP Discography entry on Now, There Was a Song!

Now, There Was a Song!
Now, There Was a Song!
Now, There Was a Song!
Legacy Recordings albums